Marcus Fagerudd (born December 17, 1992) is a Finnish-Swedish professional ice hockey player. He currently plays for Luleå HF of the Swedish Hockey League (SHL).

References

External links

1992 births
Living people
Finnish ice hockey defencemen
Luleå HF players
People from Jakobstad
Swedish-speaking Finns
Sportspeople from Ostrobothnia (region)